Caspicyclotus is a genus of gastropods belonging to the family Cyclophoridae.

The species of this genus are found in Western Asia.

Species:

Caspicyclotus akramowskii 
Caspicyclotus armenicus 
Caspicyclotus belchatoviensis 
Caspicyclotus sieversi

References

Cyclophoridae